The 1913 Rutgers Queensmen football team represented Rutgers University as an independent during the 1913 college football season. In their first season under head coach George Sanford, the Queensmen compiled a 6–3 record and outscored their opponents, 247 to 76.  Coach Sanford remained at Rutgers for 11 years and was inducted into the College Football Hall of Fame in 1971.

Schedule

References

Rutgers
Rutgers Scarlet Knights football seasons
Rutgers Queensmen football